Pendleton Murrah (1824/1826August 4, 1865) was the tenth Governor of Texas. His term in office coincided with the American Civil War.

Career
Murrah's birth date and birth location vary from source to source. Some have him born in 1824; others give his birth year as 1826. According to his 1850 and 1860 entries in the U.S. Census, Murrah was a native of Alabama. His birthplace is sometimes listed as South Carolina, but more recent sources indicate he was born in Bibb County and was the illegitimate son of Peggy Murrah, a daughter of Charles and Avarilla Jones Murrah.  He was raised and educated in a Baptist orphanage, and graduated from Brown University in 1848.  He then studied law and was admitted to the bar. He moved to Texas and opened a law practice in Marshall.

After losing a race in 1855, Murrah won election to the Texas House of Representatives in 1857, and also served on the executive committee of the Texas Democratic Party.  In 1861 he declined to run for a seat in the Confederate Congress because of ill health, probably tuberculosis, but his health recovered sufficiently that he accepted a commission in the 14th Texas Infantry, a Confederate Army unit commanded by former governor Edward Clark.  Murrah soon resigned his commission, but he won the gubernatorial election in 1863, and served until the fall of the Confederacy.

As governor during the American Civil War, Murrah emphatically supported the Confederate cause, although he ended up in a controversy over the conscription of Texas militia troops into the Confederate Army.  Still, even after Robert E. Lee surrendered in 1865, he encouraged Texans to continue the fight.

When he learned that Union Army forces were en route to Texas, Murrah fled to Mexico with other Confederate leaders. Lieutenant Governor Fletcher Summerfield Stockdale filled the vacant post, acting as governor for five days, until provisional governor Andrew J. Hamilton assumed office in August 1865.

The trip to Mexico took a toll on Murrah's health, and he died in Monterrey on August 4, 1865. His grave is located in the Panteon Municipal of Monterrey, Mexico.

Family
Charles Murrah, the grandfather of Pendleton Murrah, was born in 1775 in Warren County, North Carolina.  He traced his ancestry through his parents Charles and his Margaret (Peggy) Murrah, and through them to his grandparents Lodowick and Mira Ann Jeter Murrah of Caroline County, Virginia.

In 1850 Murrah married Sue Ellen Taylor, daughter of a prominent Texas plantation owner.  According to the 1860 census, they had no children.

See also
 "Died of states' rights" at the article Confederate States of America

External links

 Entry about Pendleton Murrah from the Biographical Encyclopedia of Texas published 1880, hosted by the Portal to Texas History.

References

1820s births
1865 deaths
Brown University alumni
Democratic Party governors of Texas
People from Marshall, Texas
People of Texas in the American Civil War
Infectious disease deaths in Mexico
Confederate States of America state governors
19th-century American politicians